Chrysopogon aciculatus (syn. Andropogon aciculatus) is a species of grass native to the tropics of Asia, Polynesia, and Australia at low elevations. Common names include amorseco (Spanish, "dry love") (not to be confused with the amor seco tree, Alchornea glandulosa), lesser spear grass, Mackie's pest, pilipiliula, and grama-amorosa (Brazilian Portuguese).

The grass is widely considered an invasive species, but some cultures use it for medicinal purposes.

Its flowering stems are about 20 to 60 centimeters high and its leaves are linear-lanceolate and  about 3 to 10 centimeters long by 4 to 6 centimeters wide. The panicles are purplish, open and with few whorled branches and can reach about 5 centimeters long, bearing few-flowered spikes. The sessile spikelet is very narrow, about 3 millimeters long. The callus is elongated and barbed and the fourth glume is linear, acuminate, and awned.

References

aciculatus
Flora of tropical Asia
Flora of the Pacific
Poales of Australia